Scirtonium or Skirtonion was a town of ancient Arcadia, in the region of Aegytis, to the south of Megalopolis. Its location is unknown.

References

Populated places in ancient Arcadia
Former populated places in Greece
Lost ancient cities and towns